Shelby Harris (born August 11, 1991) is an American football defensive end who is a free agent. He played college football at Illinois State and was selected in the seventh round of the 2014 NFL Draft by the Oakland Raiders, where he spent his first two seasons. After not making a final roster in 2016, Harris played his next five seasons with the Denver Broncos. Harris was traded to the Seahawks in 2022.

College career
Harris initially went to the University of Wisconsin to play for the Badgers. After redshirting his freshman year, he transferred to Illinois State. In 2010, he was named to the Missouri Valley Football Conference all-newcomer team. In 2012, he started all thirteen games as the Redbirds reached the FCS national quarterfinals, and he was named to the all-MVFC first-team. But before the 2013 season, he was dismissed from the Redbirds for conduct detrimental to the team.

Professional career

Oakland Raiders
Harris was selected by the Oakland Raiders in the seventh round of the 2014 NFL Draft with the 235th overall pick. On May 20, 2014, he signed his contract with the Raiders. On September 18, 2014, Harris was waived. On September 20, 2014, he was signed to the Raiders' practice squad. On December 24, 2014, he was elevated to the active roster. On September 5, 2015, he was waived. On September 9, 2015, Harris was re-signed to the practice squad. On October 24, 2015, he was elevated to the active roster. On October 31, 2015, he was waived again. On November 3, 2015, Harris was re-signed to the practice squad. On November 19, 2015, he was elevated to the active roster again. On May 16, 2016, Harris was released by the Raiders.

New York Jets
On June 1, 2016, Harris was signed by the Jets. On August 28, 2016, he was waived by the Jets.

Dallas Cowboys
On December 22, 2016, Harris was signed to the Cowboys' practice squad. He was released on January 10, 2017.

Denver Broncos
On January 25, 2017, Harris signed a reserve/future contract with the Broncos.  On September 11, 2017, on Monday Night Football Harris saved the game for the Broncos with a late-game block of a field goal by Los Angeles Chargers rookie Younghoe Koo. Harris went on to have the most productive season of his career, recording 34 tackles, 3 passes defended, and 5.5 sacks, the last of which was good for second on the team behind teammate Von Miller.

On November 25, 2018, Harris recorded his first career interception.  Harris intercepted Ben Roethlisberger in the endzone to prevent a would-be game-tying touchdown and seal an upset win for the Broncos.

On March 7, 2019, the Broncos placed a second-round restricted free agent tender on Harris.
In week 11 against the Minnesota Vikings, Harris sacked Kirk Cousins 3 times, one of which was a strip sack which was recovered by teammate A.J. Johnson in the 27–23 loss. In the final game of the season against the Oakland Raiders, he preserved the Broncos' 16–15 victory by knocking down Derek Carr's pass on what would have been the game-winning two-point conversion.

On April 2, 2020, the Broncos re-signed Harris to a one-year, $3.25 million contract. He was placed on the reserve/COVID-19 list by the team on November 4, 2020, and activated on December 2. On December 31, 2020, Harris was placed on injured reserve. He started 11 games in 2020, recording 32 tackles, 2.5 sacks, one forced fumble, and seven pass deflections, which tied for the league lead for defensive lineman.

On March 15, 2021, Harris signed a three-year, $27 million contract extension with the Broncos.

Seattle Seahawks
On March 16, 2022, Harris was traded to the Seattle Seahawks along with two first-round picks, two second-round picks, a fifth-round pick, quarterback Drew Lock, and tight end Noah Fant in exchange for quarterback Russell Wilson and a fourth-round pick. He started 14 games in 2022, recording 44 tackles, two sacks, and four passes defensed.

On March 14, 2023, Harris was released by the Seahawks.

Media appearances
Harris was featured on WNYC's podcast "Death, Sex and Money" on September 5, 2020, with host Anna Sale. On the show, Harris revealed what it's like to be an NFL player during the COVID-19 pandemic and what it's like to be a Black man in America during the Black Lives Matter movement.

References

External links
Illinois State Redbirds bio

1991 births
Living people
American football defensive ends
Wisconsin Badgers football players
Illinois State Redbirds football players
People from Mequon, Wisconsin
Players of American football from Milwaukee
Oakland Raiders players
New York Jets players
Dallas Cowboys players
Denver Broncos players
Seattle Seahawks players